Alfredo Donnarumma (born 30 November 1990) is an Italian professional footballer who plays as a forward or attacking midfielder for  club Ternana.

Club career

Torre Annunziata
Born in Torre Annunziata, near Napoli, Alfredo started his playing career with his hometown club, Calcio Azzurri di Torre Annunziata. He played there until he was 14, when Calcio Catania sporting director Pietro Lo Monaco scouted the player and signed him.

Catania
After transferring to Catania, Donnarumma played for all levels of the club's youth setup and in 2008 joined the Primavera U-20 team of Catania, the highest youth level below the first team. He formed a great partnership with Alessandro Malafronte and most notably Francesco Nicastro during his time within Catania's youth program. He also scored 16 goals in his final youth season at the club. His senior playing career began in 2009, when the attacker earned first-team call-ups towards the end of the 2009–10 Serie A campaign, at the age of 18. Despite failing to make his Serie A debut with the club, the player graduated the club's youth set-up at the conclusion of the 2009–10 season.

In July 2010, Donnarumma was loaned out to Lega Pro Prima Divisione side, A.S. Gubbio 1910 in order to earn regular playing experience. During his spell with the third division club, Donnarumma made 23 league appearances, scoring 5 league goals. In his 25 official matches for the Gubbio, Donnarumma was a part of the starting lineup 22 times. On 30 June 2011, Donnarumma returned to Catania, where he remained until 30 January 2012, when he was sent out on loan to Lega Pro Prima Divisione side,  Virtus Lanciano after failing to make his Catania debut. With the Lanciano-based club, Donnarumma spent time with the senior squad as well as the youth team. With the youth side, Donnarumma scored 8 goals in just 8 appearances, while with the first team, he failed to have the same impact. During the ritorno of the 2011–12 Lega Pro campaign, he appeared just 10 times for the club, all as a substitute. After again returning to Sicily, Donnarumma was asked to go out on loan once more prior to the 2012–13 Serie A season. He transferred to Calcio Como on 11 July 2012, and had a successful season with the team. He was virtually ever-present for the third division club, appearing in 29 league matches (27 of which were starts) and scoring 14 league goals.

Alfredo Donnarumma returned to Catania on 30 June 2013.

Cittadella
On 2 September 2013, Donnarumma was officially sold on a co-ownership basis to A.S. Cittadella for a peppercorn fee of five hundred euro. In June 2014 Cittadella signed Donnarumma outright.

Pescara & Teramo
In summer 2014 Donnarumma was signed by Pescara. In the same year he was loaned to Teramo. On 17 July 2015, Donnarumma was signed by Teramo outright. However, the Serie B newcomer was expelled due to match-fixing.

Salernitana
On 31 August 2015, Donnarumma was sold to Salernitana.

Empoli
On 11 July 2017, Donnarumma was signed by Empoli from Salernitana. He helped Empoli win the Serie B title and achieve promotion to Serie A during the 2017–18 season, forming a prolific attacking partnership with Francesco Caputo; together, the pair scored 49 goals, finishing as the top two scorers in the league, with Donnarumma scoring 23 goals and Caputo 26.

Brescia
On 13 July 2018, Donnarumma signed with Brescia. Donnarumma won the 2018–19 Serie B title with Brescia, finishing the season as the league's top scorer with 25 goals, thus helping the club to achieve promotion to Serie A.

On 25 August 2019, Donnarumma made his Serie A debut, also scoring his first goal in the Italian top flight, in a 1–0 away win over Cagliari.

Ternana
On 11 August 2021, he moved to Ternana on loan with an obligation to buy.

Style of play
Although he primarily plays off of another forward as a second striker, Donnarumma is capable of playing anywhere along the front line, and has also been deployed in the centre as a main striker, out wide as a winger, or even in a deeper, creative role as an attacking midfielder. A fast forward with good technique, dribbling skills in one on one situations, link-up play, and an ability to read the game, his biggest strengths as a player are his tenacity, bravery, tactical intelligence, and work-rate off the ball, as well as his ability to create space with his movement, and provide depth to his team by holding up the ball for his teammates with his back to goal. Although he is known for his ability to create chances and provide assists for other players, he also possesses a keen eye for goal and, despite not being particularly tall or strong from a physical standpoint, is effective in the air, and is capable of scoring with either foot, as well as his head, despite being naturally right footed.

Personal life
On 27 November 2020, it was announced that Donnarumma tested positive for COVID-19, while being asymptomatic, amid its pandemic in Italy.

Honours
Empoli
 Serie B: 2017–18

Brescia
 Serie B: 2018–19

Individual
Serie B top scorer: 2018–19 (25 goals)

References

External links
 thefinalball.com
 
 

Living people
1990 births
People from Torre Annunziata
Footballers from Campania
Association football forwards
Italian footballers
Catania S.S.D. players
A.S. Gubbio 1910 players
S.S. Virtus Lanciano 1924 players
Como 1907 players
A.S. Cittadella players
Delfino Pescara 1936 players
S.S. Teramo Calcio players
U.S. Salernitana 1919 players
Empoli F.C. players
Brescia Calcio players
Ternana Calcio players
Serie A players
Serie B players
Serie C players